Clothing technology involves the manufacturing, materials - innovations that have been developed and used. The timeline of clothing and textiles technology includes major changes in the manufacture and distribution of clothing.

From clothing in the ancient world into modernity, the use of technology has dramatically influenced clothing and fashion in the modern age. Industrialization brought changes in the manufacture of goods. In many nations, homemade goods crafted by hand have largely been replaced by factory produced goods on assembly lines purchased in a consumer culture. Innovations include man-made materials such as polyester, nylon, and vinyl as well as features like zippers and velcro. The advent of advanced electronics has resulted in wearable technology being developed and popularized since the 1980s. 

Design is an important part of the industry beyond utilitarian concerns and the fashion and glamour industries have developed in relation to clothing marketing and retail. Environmental and human rights issues have also become considerations for clothing and spurred the promotion and use of some natural materials such as bamboo that are considered environmentally friendly.

Production
The advent of industrialization included factories, specialized and technologically advanced equipment, and production lines for the mass production of textiles. Globalization and advances in trade increased sourcing of materials and competition for wares across borders. The swadeshi movement in India was an effort to counteract the economic control and influence that British factories exerted over the one-time colony. Concerns have also been raised over the use of so-called sweat shops. 

Clothing lines based on famous designers have been featured and advertised in magazines and other media. Branding and [marketing] are features of the advertising age. Some designers have also become television and media personalities. In recent years fashion and design has also been the subject of television shows.

The media and different networking sites have a tremendous effect on the production of clothing. Complex software is used to go through and analyze important data related to production and consumerism. This process needs to be done quickly and efficiently in order for companies to meet customer demand thus enhancing their profit and brand.

Sports
The design and constructions of sportswear has changed dramatically over time.  Athletic apparel aids in the prevention of injuries, the improvement of breathability, the protection from the weather, and the encouragement of a fitness mindset. Athletes can now use wearable heart rate monitors and fitness trackers to capture a variety of fitness-related parameters, such as distance traveled, calorie consumption, heart rate, and sleep quality.

Education
Computer-aided design is used in the development of clothing. Corporate and business training to address accounting, trade, and finance issues has also become a significant part of the trade. Courses and programs at Universities specialize in these fields. the Beijing Institute of Clothing Technology and Fachhochschule für Technik und Wirtschaft Berlin are examples institutions focused on the business. In the area of engineering development of functional clothing, TU Dresden, Germany provides courses at Bachelor, Dipl.-Ing and non-consecutive MSc. degree and HS Niedererrhein (Mönchengladbach) provides B.Sc. and M.Sc. programs.  National governments have also become involved in the business with trade rules and negotiations as well as investments such as Europe's Future Textiles and Clothing program.

Research and scientifc publications 
The modern clothing development is performed using 3D avatars, often obtained trough 3D scanning. Obtaining valid body measurements from 3D scan is still research area, while the recent topics are more related more to the speed and the accuracy of the process, than to the methods for this. TU Dresden applies high speed (4D) scanning system, developed by IBV for analysis of human body deformations during motion. Open access journal as source for reading the latest research in the area clothing development, related to soft avatars, protective clothing, comfort and other topics is the CDATP journal.

See also

 Textile manufacturing
 Wet processing engineering
 Spinning (textiles)
 E-textiles
 Gore-Tex
 Polypropylene
 Rayon
 Smart fabric
 Smart shirt
 SuperFabric
 Zephyr Technology

References

History of clothing
Textile engineering
Clothing industry
Textile industry